Kleban is a surname. Notable people with the surname include: 

Edward Kleban (1939–1987), American musical theatre composer and lyricist
Matthew Kleban, American theoretical physicist